Alexander Hegarth (1923–1984) was a German film and television actor.

Selected filmography

Film
 My Wife Makes Music (1958)
 The Twins from Immenhof (1973)

Television
 Maximilian von Mexiko (1970)
 Arsène Lupin (1971) season 1, episode 12 
 The Buddenbrooks (1979)

References

Bibliography
 Franz Josef Görtz & Hans Sarkowicz. Heinz Rühmann, 1902-1994: der Schauspieler und sein Jahrhundert. C.H.Beck, 2001.

External links

1923 births
1984 deaths
20th-century German male actors
German male film actors
German male television actors
Actors from Dresden